Rasina is a Slavic toponym that may refer to:

 Rasina District, a district in Serbia
 Rasina (river), a river in Rasina District
 Rasina, Estonia, a village in Põlva Parish, Põlva County, Estonia
 Rasina, Kaithal, a village in Kaithal District, Haryana, India

Serbo-Croatian place names